The Women's National Basketball Association's Top 15 Players of All Time were chosen in 2011 on the occasion of the fifteenth season of the WNBA from amongst 30 nominees compiled by the league by fan, media, coach, and player voting. The group was to comprise the 15 best and most influential players of the first fifteen years of the WNBA, with consideration also accorded to sportsmanship, community service, 1111leadership, and contribution to the growth of women's basketball; only players to have competed in the WNBA were eligible, but extra-league achievements were considered.

The Top 15 players were announced at halftime of the 2011 WNBA All-Star Game.

Players selected
Note: all information only pertains to the first fifteen years of the league's existence.

The inaugural WNBA All-Star Game took place during the 1999 season, and the game has been contested yearly since, although the 2004 edition was supplanted by a game between WNBA players from both conferences and the 2004 United States Olympic team and the 2010 edition was a game between WNBA players from both conferences and the USA National Team. For the purposes of this article, appearances in the 2004 and 2010 games for both participating teams are considered All-Star appearances. This differs from the WNBA's practice, which does not count Team USA players in 2004 and 2010 as All-Stars, even though all members of Team USA except for Maya Moore in 2010 were WNBA players at the time of the two games. There was no All-Star Game held in 2008.
Players who were voted to start in all-star games but were unable to play due to injury are nevertheless considered to have been starters; players voted as reserves who started in place of other injured players are nevertheless considered to have been reserves.

Other finalists

Seimone Augustus
Ruthie Bolton1
Swin Cash
Katie Douglas
Cheryl Ford2
Chamique Holdsclaw1
Shannon Johnson1
Taj McWilliams-Franklin
DeLisha Milton-Jones
Deanna Nolan2
Candace Parker
Nykesha Sales1
Tangela Smith
Penny Taylor
Natalie Williams1

1 Retired at time of Top 15 Team announcement.
2 Not playing in the league at time of Top 15 Team announcement.

Top 15 Players vs. All-Decade Team
All ten members of the WNBA's All-Decade Team were included in the Top 15 Team. There were some players that were nominated for the Top 15 Team that were not nominated for the All-Decade Team and vice versa. Below are lists of players that were either added to or omitted from the Top 15 Team nominations, in respect to the All-Decade Team nominations.

Added
Maya Moore
Seimone Augustus
Sylvia Fowles
Lindsay Whalen
Cappie Pondexter
Tangela Smith

Omitted
Janeth Arcain
Tamecka Dixon
Jennifer Gillom
Vickie Johnson
Rebecca Lobo
Mwadi Mabika
Andrea Stinson

References

External links
Official announcement on WNBA.com

Lists of Women's National Basketball Association players
2011 WNBA season